Shibuhara Girls is a MTV Japan/MTV Asia reality mini-series that centers on the lives of a group of young aspiring Japanese women as they seek stardom in the popular pop culture and fashion districts of Tokyo, Japan; Shibuya and Harajuku.

All the dialogue and narration in the series is in Japanese, however English subtitles are available in English speaking markets.

In Season 2, Shibuhara Girls was aired on MTV Japan from 4 December 2011 until 26 February 2012. In Southeast Asia, It will be aired on MTV Asia on 21 March 2012. Since October 2013, Shibuhara Girls is also broadcast in France on the new channel J-One, which is a channel focus on Japanese Culture.

Cast

References

External links
 
 
MTV JAPAN

MTV original programming
Japanese reality television series